Anastasia Aleksandrovna Fedotova (born 30 November 1998) is a Russian water polo player. She competed in the 2020 Summer Olympics as alternate.

References

External links
 

Russian female water polo players
1998 births
Living people
European Games gold medalists for Russia
Water polo players at the 2015 European Games
European Games medalists in water polo
Water polo players at the 2020 Summer Olympics
Olympic water polo players of Russia
21st-century Russian women